{|
{{Infobox ship image
|Ship image=HMS Carnatic off Plymouth, 18 August 1789 RMG B6883 (cropped).jpg
|Ship caption=HMS Carnatic off Plymouth, 18 August 1789
}}

|}

HMS Carnatic was a 74-gun third rate ship of the line of the Royal Navy, launched on 21 January 1783 at Deptford Wharf. The British East India Company paid for her construction and presented her to the Royal Navy.

On 17 May 1815, the Admiralty renamed her HMS Captain. Captain was broken up on 30 September 1825.

Citations

References

Hackman, Rowan (2001) Ships of the East India Company''. (Gravesend, Kent: World Ship Society). 
 

Ships of the line of the Royal Navy
Courageux-class ships of the line
1783 ships
Ships built in Deptford